Alice Gets Stung is a 1925 animated short film by Walt Disney in the Alice Comedies series. It was Virginia Davis' last performance as Alice.  As of January 1, 2021, this film has fallen into the public domain in the United States.

Plot 
Julius the Cat and Alice are hunting a wily rabbit, when they come across a bear, among other animals. Alice attempts to shoot the bear, but the bear ends up chasing them into a barrel. The bear then knocks a bee hive into the barrel (thus the "gets stung" in the title).

Film

References

External links 

 
 Alice Gets Stung at The Encyclopedia of DisneyAnimated Shorts

1925 films
1925 short films
1920s Disney animated short films
Films directed by Walt Disney
Alice Comedies
1925 animated films
American silent short films
American black-and-white films
Animated films about cats
Animated films about rabbits and hares
1925 comedy films
Animated films without speech
Films about hunters
1920s American films